The Canton of Londinières is a former canton situated in the Seine-Maritime département and in the Haute-Normandie region of northern France. It was disbanded following the French canton reorganisation which came into effect in March 2015. It consisted of 16 communes, which joined the canton of Neufchâtel-en-Bray in 2015. It had a total of 5,251 inhabitants (2012).

Geography 
An area of farming and forestry in the arrondissement of Dieppe, centred on the town of Londinières. The altitude varies from 40m (Osmoy-Saint-Valery) to 224m (Clais) for an average altitude of 116m.

The canton comprised 16 communes:

Bailleul-Neuville
Baillolet
Bures-en-Bray
Clais
Croixdalle
Fréauville
Fresnoy-Folny
Grandcourt
Londinières
Osmoy-Saint-Valery
Preuseville
Puisenval
Saint-Pierre-des-Jonquières
Sainte-Agathe-d'Aliermont
Smermesnil
Wanchy-Capval

Population

See also 
 Arrondissements of the Seine-Maritime department
 Cantons of the Seine-Maritime department
 Communes of the Seine-Maritime department

References

Londinieres
2015 disestablishments in France
States and territories disestablished in 2015